Punchbowl is a residential locality in the local government area (LGA) of Launceston in the Launceston LGA region of Tasmania. The 2016 census recorded a population of 463 for the state suburb of Punchbowl.
It is a very small suburb of Launceston.

History 
Punchbowl was gazetted as a locality in 1963. The name was changed from “Punch Bowl” in 1999.

Geography
Almost all of the boundaries are survey lines.

Road infrastructure 
An unnumbered route (Hobart Road) passes to the west. From there, Punchbowl Road provides access to the locality.

References

Suburbs of Launceston, Tasmania
Localities of City of Launceston